Anders Fannemel (born 13 May 1991) is a Norwegian ski jumper. He is a former ski flying world record holder, with  set in Vikersund on 15 February 2015.

Career 

Fannemel started ski jumping when he was 14 years old, which is rather late compared to other elite ski jumpers. He made his debut in the Continental Cup in September 2008 in Lillehammer, scoring two seventh places over two days. He finished in lower positions throughout the rest of the 2008/09 season, but in the 2009/10 season he recorded a fifth and a first place in the Continental Cup, again in Lillehammer, in August 2009.

He made his World Cup debut in December 2009, again in Lillehammer, and collected his first World Cup points by finishing tenth. He has two world cup wins and another five podiums. In 2015 season he was the first time in his career World Cup overall leader.

He holds the world record for the world's longest ski jump at 251.5 meters (825 feet), which he jumped in Vikersund, Norway on 15 February 2015, beating Peter Prevc's record that was set the day before by 1.5 meters.

He represents the sports club Hornindal IL and lives in Hornindal.

World Cup

Standings

Wins

Ski jumping world record

References

External links

 
 
 

1991 births
Living people
Norwegian male ski jumpers
People from Hornindal
Ski jumpers at the 2014 Winter Olympics
Olympic ski jumpers of Norway
FIS Nordic World Ski Championships medalists in ski jumping
World record setters in ski flying
Sportspeople from Vestland
21st-century Norwegian people